Shaimum Sarwar Kamal is a Bangladesh Awami League politician and the incumbent Member of Parliament from Cox's Bazar-3.

Early life
Shaimum Sarwar Kamal is the son of former Bangladesh Awami Leader and diplomat, Osman Sarwar Alam Chowdhury.

Career
Kamal contested the 2008 election from Cox's Bazar-3 but lost the election to Bangladesh Nationalist Party candidate, Lutfur Rahman Kajal. He was elected to Parliament from Cox's Bazar-3 in 2014 as a Bangladesh Awami League candidate.

References

Awami League politicians
Living people
10th Jatiya Sangsad members
11th Jatiya Sangsad members
Year of birth missing (living people)